Remuera Intermediate School (R.I) is a school catering for 11 to 13 year olds in Remuera, Auckland, New Zealand. It was founded in 1954. The current principal of the school is Kyle Brewerton. The school's current student count consists of 867 students, however the roll number varies between 850 and 1000 each year.

See also
List of schools in the Auckland Region

References

External links

TKI entry

Educational institutions established in 1954
Intermediate schools in Auckland
1954 establishments in New Zealand